Nesin Mathematics Village is an educational and research institute devoted to mathematics, which is located  from Şirince village in Selçuk district of Izmir Province in western Turkey. 

It was launched in 2007 by Ali Nesin, a veteran mathematics professor, who heads up education non-profit Nesin Foundation established by his father, humorist writer Aziz Nesin (1915–1995). Mathematics Village is funded by donations made to the Nesin Foundation.

Nesin Mathematics Village hosts various mathematical activities, mostly short summer courses. Teaching in the mathematics village "is voluntary; while the mathematics village does not provide honoria for the teachers, it provides free accommodations and meals". Courses range from high-school to graduate university courses. All high school courses are taught in Turkish, as the students do not necessarily know foreign languages, but any undergraduate or postgraduate course may be taught in English.

Students usually stay in the village for a cycle of two weeks. Each Thursday, a vacation activity is organized. There are no TVs or broadcast music, although there are occasionally film screenings.

Around fifteen paid staff and nearly one hundred volunteers work there every year. The village has also been hosting domestic and international mathematics meetings recently.

Ali Nesin was bestowed the 2018 Leelavati Award for "his outstanding contributions towards increasing public awareness of mathematics in Turkey, in particular for his tireless work in creating the 'Mathematical Village' as an exceptional, peaceful place for education, research, and the exploration of mathematics for anyone."

Demolition scare
According to a statement in July 2017 by Tekin Karadağ, the president of the Şirince Environment and Nature Association, Nesin Mathematics Village was slated for demolition by the authorities as being an "illegal construction". However, Harun Abuş, Director of Development and City Planning of Selçuk Municipality, declared that at this moment Nesin Mathematics Village is "not on the demolition calendar".

See also 
 Sevan Nişanyan

References

External links 
 Nesin Mathematics Village website
 Article on the maths village
 A trip diary to the maths village
 Sevan Nisanyan on the maths village
 Ali Nesin's Homepage

Mathematical institutes
Schools in Turkey
2007 establishments in Turkey
Selçuk District